"The Garden of Paradise" is a literary fairy tale by Hans Christian Andersen first published by C. A. Reitzel in Copenhagen, Denmark on 19 October 1839 with "The Flying Trunk" and "The Storks" in Fairy Tales Told for Children. New Collection. Second Booklet (Eventyr, fortalte for Børn. Ny Samling. Andet Hefte). King Max read and liked the tale. Andersen biographer Jackie Wullschlager considers the story and its two companion pieces in the booklet as "grim".  "The Garden of Paradise" ends with Death approaching a young prince and warning him to expiate his sins for, one day, he will come for him and "clap him in the black coffin".

References
Footnotes

Works cited

External links

 "Paradisets Have". Original Danish text 
 The Garden of Paradise". English translation by Jean Hersholt

1839 short stories
Danish fairy tales
Short stories by Hans Christian Andersen